The 2011 Shimizu S-Pulse season was Shimizu S-Pulse's twentieth season in existence and nineteenth consecutive season in J. League Division 1. The team also competed in the 2011 J.League Cup, and the 2011 Emperor's Cup.

Players

Competitions

J. League

Table

Matches

Results by round

J. League Cup

Emperor's Cup

References

Shimizu S-Pulse
Shimizu S-Pulse seasons